Plagiogyria is a genus of ferns, the only genus in family Plagiogyriaceae in the Pteridophyte Phylogeny Group classification of 2016 (PPG I). Alternatively, the family may be treated as the subfamily Plagiogyrioideae of a very broadly defined family Cyatheaceae, the placement used for the genus in Plants of the World Online .

Ferns of this genus present two kind of fronds, the fertile ones longer than the sterile. These ferns are found on forest soils in mountainous areas of tropical and subtropical regions. Most are native to Asia; one is found in the Americas.

Phylogeny
, Plants of the World Online accepted the following species. Phylogeny of Plagiogyria 

Other species include:
 P. assurgens Christ
 P. falcata Copel.
 P. ×neointermedia]] Nakaike
 P. pycnophylla (Kunze) Mett.
 [[Plagiogyria × sessilifolia|P. ×sessilifolia Nakaike

References

Cyatheales
Taxonomy articles created by Polbot
Fern genera